The Composer's Cut Series Vol. II: Nyman/Greenaway Revisited is the second in a series of albums, all released on the same day,  by Michael Nyman to feature concert versions of film scores, in this case, films of Peter Greenaway, and his 52nd release overall.  The album is similar to The Essential Michael Nyman Band, although a number of tracks are on only one album or the other.  In spite of being recorded in 1992, with the same lineup, Memorial is not the same performance as the one that appears on The Essential Michael Nyman Band or After Extra Time, which was recorded in Tokyo.  This performance was recorded in London and is slightly less aggressively performed.

Track listing
An eye for optical theory (The Draughtsman's Contract)
Queen of the night (The Draughtsman's Contract)
Chasing sheep is best left to shepherds (The Draughtsman's Contract)
Car crash (A Zed And Two Noughts)
Time lapse (A Zed And Two Noughts)
Vermeer's Wife (A Zed And Two Noughts)
Trysting fields/Sheep 'n' tides (Drowning by Numbers)
Wheelbarrow walk (Drowning by Numbers)
Fish beach (Drowning by Numbers)
Memorial (The Cook, The Thief, His Wife and Her Lover)
Come unto these yellow sands (Prospero's Books)
Prospero's curse (Prospero's Books)
Miranda (Prospero's Books)

Personnel 
The Michael Nyman Band
 Michael Nyman, piano
 Gabrielle Lester, 1st violin
 Cathy Thompson, 2nd violin
 Catherine Musker, viola
 Anthony Hinnigan, cello
 David Roach, soprano and alto saxophone
 Simon Haram, soprano and alto saxophone
 Andy Findon, baritone saxophone, flute, piccolo
 Martin Elliott, bass guitar
 Dave Lee, horn
 Steve Sidwell, trumpet
 Nigel Gomme, trumpet
 Nigel Barr, bass trombone, tuba
 Ian Humphries, violin
 Beverley Davison, violin

Memorial
Sarah Leonard, soprano
Alexander Balanescu, violin
Clare Conners, violin
Catherine Musker, viola
Anthony Hinnigan, cello
Martin Elliott, bass guitar
John Harle, alto saxophone
David Roach, alto saxophone
Andy Findon, baritone saxophone
Steve Sidwell, trumpet
Marjorie Dunn, horn
Nigel Barr, bass trombone
Music composed, conducted and produced by Michael Nyman 
Recorded at Abbey Road Studios, April 2005, by Austing Ince
except track 10 recorded at Abbey Road Studios, 1992 by Michael Dutton
All tracks edited and mixed at Olympic Studios, August 2005, by Austin Ince
Mastered by Peter Mew at Abbey Road Studios, August 2005
Published by Chester Music Ltd./Michael Nyman Ltd.
Design by Russell Mills (shed) 
Co-design by Michael Webster (storm) 
Photography by Michael Nyman

References 

2006 albums
Michael Nyman albums